Michael La Rosa (born 10 April 1991) is a Belgian former professional footballer who played as a left winger.

External links
 Voetbal International profile 
 

1991 births
Living people
Belgian footballers
MVV Maastricht players
Eerste Divisie players
Sportspeople from Genk
Footballers from Limburg (Belgium)
Association football midfielders
Belgian expatriate footballers
Expatriate footballers in the Netherlands
Belgian expatriate sportspeople in the Netherlands